The Roman Catholic Church in Lesotho is composed of 1 ecclesiastical province and 3 suffragan dioceses.

List of Roman Catholic dioceses

Episcopal Conference of Lesotho

Ecclesiastical Province of Maseru
Archdiocese of Maseru
Diocese of Mohale’s Hoek
Diocese of Qacha’s Nek
Diocese of Leribe

External links 
Catholic-Hierarchy entry.
GCatholic.org.

Lesotho
Catholic dioceses